Rain in Hell is an EP/DVD by the post-hardcore band Aiden.

Contents
It includes new tracks as well as a cover of The Misfits' "Die, Die My Darling" and Billy Idol's "White Wedding". "Silent Eyes" was written about the death of former Bayside drummer John "Beatz" Holohan. The DVD features live performances from England and Chicago as well as music videos. A rough mix of "Die Die My Darling" was featured on a Kerrang! cover CD titled High Voltage!: A Brief History of Rock.

Release
On August 29, 2006, Rain in Hell was announced for release. On October 17, "The Suffering" was made available for streaming via the band's Myspace account. It was released on October 31 through Victory. An official music video for the song "We Sleep Forever" was also released on March 12, 2007.

Track listing

DVD listing
Live set from Never Sleep Again Tour in Chicago's House of Blues
"Knife Blood Nightmare" (live)
"Last Sunrise" (live)
"Die Romantic" (live)
"Goodbye, We're Falling Fast" (live) [Not listed in case or DVD menu]
"I Set My Friends on Fire" (live)
"World by Storm" (live)
"Knife Blood Nightmare" (video)
"Die Romantic" (video)
"The Last Sunrise" (video)
Extra bonus hometown performances
"Last Sunrise" (live)
"Die Romantic" (live)
"Unbreakable" (live)
"I Set My Friends on Fire" (live)

Chart positions

References

Aiden albums
2006 EPs
2006 live albums
Live video albums
2006 video albums
Victory Records live albums
Victory Records video albums
Victory Records EPs